Big Fan  is an American short-lived game show that debuted on ABC. The series premiered on January 9, 2017.

Details
The US TV network  ABC announced Big Fan in February 2016. The series is based on a segment on Jimmy Kimmel Live! called Who Knows...?, in which a contestant competes against a celebrity or sports figure of whom he or she is a fan, answering trivia and biographical questions about the star.

The half-hour series is hosted by Andy Richter, with Jimmy Kimmel, David Goldberg, and Caroline Baumgard as executive producers, and Banijay Studios North America producing.

Episodes

Link

References

2017 American television series debuts
2017 American television series endings
2010s American game shows
English-language television shows
American Broadcasting Company original programming
American television spin-offs
Television series by Banijay